Kerry-Ann Richards (born 22 April 1976) is a Jamaican track and field athlete. She represented her country in sprinting on several junior and senior teams. She won gold medals as part of the Jamaican 4×100 metres relay teams at the Pan American Games in 1999. Richards ran track collegiately at the University of Illinois at Urbana–Champaign where she was six-times Big Ten Conference champion, Big Ten Freshman of the Year and three times NCAA Division I All-American. Richards earned her master's degree at Illinois in 2000, was named to the National Dean's List as well as being an multiple times NCAA Academic All-American.

References

External links

1976 births
Living people
Illinois Fighting Illini women's track and field athletes
Athletes (track and field) at the 1995 Pan American Games
Athletes (track and field) at the 1999 Pan American Games
Jamaican female sprinters
Pan American Games gold medalists for Jamaica
Pan American Games medalists in athletics (track and field)
Medalists at the 1999 Pan American Games
20th-century Jamaican women
Competitors at the 1993 Central American and Caribbean Games
Central American and Caribbean Games bronze medalists for Jamaica
Central American and Caribbean Games medalists in athletics